Theodor Siebel (January 16, 1897 – September 14, 1975) was a German politician of the Christian Democratic Union (CDU) and former member of the German Bundestag.

Life 
Siebel joined the CDU in 1945 and was chairman of the Siegerland district CDU association. After 1945 he was a member of the district council of Siegen. He was a member of the German Bundestag from 1949 to 1961. In parliament he represented the constituency of Siegen-Stadt und -Land, in which he was always directly elected and in 1957 even with an absolute majority of 51.4% of the first votes. From 1953 to 1957 he was deputy chairman of the Bundestag Committee for Postal and Telecommunications Affairs.

Literature

References

1897 births
1975 deaths
Members of the Bundestag for North Rhine-Westphalia
Members of the Bundestag 1957–1961
Members of the Bundestag 1953–1957
Members of the Bundestag 1949–1953
Members of the Bundestag for the Christian Democratic Union of Germany